The following elections occurred in the year 1930.

Asia
 1930 Persian legislative election
 1930 Madras Presidency legislative council election
 1930 Japanese general election

Europe
 1930 Finnish parliamentary election
 1930 Norwegian parliamentary election
 1930 Polish legislative election

Germany
 1930 German federal election
 Brunswick Landtag election, 14 September 1930.

United Kingdom
 1930 Bromley by-election
 1930 Nottingham Central by-election
 1930 East Renfrewshire by-election
 1930 Whitechapel and St Georges by-election

North America

Canada
 1930 Canadian federal election
 1930 Alberta general election
 1930 Edmonton municipal election
 1930 New Brunswick general election
 1930 Sudbury municipal election
 1930 Toronto municipal election

United States
 United States House of Representatives elections in California, 1930
 1930 California gubernatorial election
 1930 Minnesota gubernatorial election
 1930 New Orleans mayoral election
 1930 New York state election
 United States House of Representatives elections in South Carolina, 1930
 United States Senate election in South Carolina, 1930
 1930 South Carolina gubernatorial election
 1930 United States House of Representatives elections

United States Senate
 1930 United States Senate elections
 United States Senate election in Massachusetts, 1930

South America 
 1930 Argentine legislative election
 1930 Brazilian presidential election
 Guatemalan presidential election, 17 December 1930
 Guatemalan presidential election, 29 December 1930
 1930 Honduran legislative election
 1930 Nicaraguan parliamentary election

Oceania

Australia
 1930 New South Wales state election
 1930 South Australian state election

See also
 :Category:1930 elections

1930
Elections